Natalie Angier /ænˈdʒɪər/ (born February 16, 1958 in the Bronx, New York City) is an American nonfiction writer and a science journalist for The New York Times. Her awards include the Pulitzer Prize for Beat Reporting in 1991 and the AAAS Westinghouse Science Journalism Award in 1992.  She is also noted for her public identification as an atheist and received the Freedom from Religion Foundation’s Emperor Has No Clothes Award in 2003.

Early life

Angier was born in the Bronx, New York City, on February 16, 1958, to Keith Angier and Adele Angier, née Rosenthal.  She was raised in the Bronx and New Buffalo, Michigan.

Education

Angier began her college studies at age 16 at the University of Michigan.  After completing two years at the University of Michigan, she studied English, physics, and astronomy at Barnard College, where she graduated magna cum laude in 1978.  She also studied medieval literature, post graduation.

Career

Angier began her writing career as a technical writer for Texas Instruments.  She was then hired as a founding staff member of Discover Magazine in 1980 and largely wrote about evolutionary biology and animal behavior during her four years there.  After Discover, she worked as a senior science writer for Time Magazine; as an editor at the women's magazine, Savvy (now defunct); and as a professor at the New York University’s Graduate Program in Science and Environmental Reporting.

In 1990, Angier joined The New York Times as a science writer and remains on staff.  She won the Pulitzer Prize for Beat Reporting in 1991 and the AAAS Westinghouse Science Journalism Award in 1992., among many other awards detailed in the Awards and honors section below.

Her writing has appeared in print and on-line magazines:  The American Scholar, The Atlantic, GEO, National Geographic, O magazine, Parade, Slate, Smithsonian, Washington Monthly, among others.  Angier's books and anthology contributions are detailed in the Books section below.

Angier is a voting member of the usage panel of The American Heritage Dictionary.

Philosophical views

Angier first publicly described herself as an atheist in 2001:

This, in part, is why Angier was presented with the Freedom from Religion Foundation’s Emperor Has No Clothes Award in 2003.

Personal life

Angier married Rick Weiss on July 27, 1991.  Rick Weiss is a former science reporter for The Washington Post.  Angier and Weiss live in Takoma Park, Maryland and have a daughter, Katherine Weiss Angier, who graduated summa cum laude in 2018 from Princeton with a degree in Biology.

Awards and honors

 Natural Obsessions named AAAS Notable Book of the Year, 1988
 Natural Obsessions named New York Times Notable Book of the Year, 1988
 Pulitzer Prize for Beat Reporting, 1991
 AAAS Science Journalism Award (Large Newspaper), 1992
 New York Times Bestseller (Nonfiction), 1999:  Woman: An Intimate Geography
 Freedom from Religion Foundation’s Emperor Has No Clothes Award, 2003
 A. D. White Professor-at-Large at Cornell University, six-year appointment, 2006–2012
 Committee for Skeptical Inquiry’s Robert P. Balles Prize in Critical Thinking, 2007, for The Canon: A Whirligig Tour of the Beautiful Basics of Science
 New York Times Bestseller (Nonfiction), 2007:  The Canon: A Whirligig Tour of the Beautiful Basics of Science
 AAAS/Subaru SB&F Prize for Excellence in Science Books Finalist, 2008, for The Canon: A Whirligig Tour of the Beautiful Basics of Science
 American Library Association’s Notable Book for Adults Award, 2008, for The Canon: A Whirligig Tour of the Beautiful Basics of Science
 Keynote speaker for the 2009 Washington & Jefferson College commencement exercises
 Barnard College Distinguished Alumna Award
 General Motors International Award for Writing about Cancer
 Lewis Thomas Award for Distinguished Writing in the Life Sciences
 Exploratorium Public Understanding of Science Award
 Voting member of the usage panel of The American Heritage Dictionary

Books

 Author:  Natural Obsessions: Striving to Unlock the Deepest Secrets of the Cancer Cell, 1988,  1999 Paperback
 Contributor:  New Science Journalists, 1995,  Paperback
 Author:  The Beauty of the Beastly: New Views on the Nature of Life, 1995,  1996 Paperback
 Author:  Woman: An Intimate Geography, 1999,  2014 Paperback
 Contributor:  The Best American Science Writing 2000, 2000,  Paperback
 Contributor:  The Best American Science Writing 2001, 2001,  Paperback
 Contributor:  The Best American Science Writing 2002, 2002,  Paperback
 Editor:  The Best American Science and Nature Writing 2002, 2002,  Paperback
 Contributor:  The Bitch in the House: 26 Women Tell the Truth About Sex, Solitude, Work, Motherhood, and Marriage, 2002,  Paperback
 Contributor:  When Race Becomes Real: Black and White Writers Confront Their Personal Histories, 2002,  Hardcover
 Contributor:  Sisterhood Is Forever: The Women’s Anthology for a New Millennium, 2003,  Paperback
 Contributor:  The Best American Science Writing 2003, 2003,  Paperback
 Contributor:  The Best American Science Writing 2005, 2005,  Paperback
 Contributor:  The Best American Science Writing 2005, 2005,  Paperback
 Contributor:  Axelrod & Cooper’s Concise Guide to Writing, 4th Edition, 2006,  Paperback
 Author:  The Canon: A Whirligig Tour of the Beautiful Basics of Science, 2007,  Paperback
 Editor:  The Best American Science Writing 2009, 2009,  Paperback
 Author:  Woman: An Intimate Geography, Revised and Updated Edition, 2014,  Paperback

External links

 Video:  Angier interview by Charlie Rose on 5/5/1999, discussing the female body and her book, Woman
 Video:  Angier reads from The Canon: A Whirligig Tour of the Beautiful Basics of Science on a book tour
 Video:  Science, Sex and Society: A Conversation with Natalie Angier
Positive Atheism’s Big List of Quotations: Natalie Angier

References

Living people
1958 births
Barnard College alumni
University of Michigan alumni
American science journalists
Pulitzer Prize for Beat Reporting winners
American atheists
The New York Times writers
American women journalists
Women science writers
Writers from the Bronx
People from Takoma Park, Maryland
21st-century American women